Addy may refer to:

Addy! (artist, producer, engineer)
Addy (surname)
Addy, Washington, US, an unincorporated community
Addy Awards, advertising competition 
Zack Addy, fictional character in the television series Bones
Addy Walker, a doll from the American Girl series
Adderall, a drug for ADHD and narcolepsy
Adamantite, an imaginary rock or mineral of impenetrable hardness;

See also
Addey (disambiguation), a surname
Addie (disambiguation)